Vito Anthony Marcantonio (December 10, 1902 – August 9, 1954) was an Italian-American lawyer and politician who served East Harlem for seven terms in the United States House of Representatives.

For most of his political career, he was a member of the American Labor Party, believing that neither major American political party supported the interests of the working class. For two years prior to his party switching to Labor, he was a New Deal coalition member of the progressive branch of the Republican Party as a supporter of Fiorello LaGuardia (prior to the party's realignment as a mostly conservative party). Marcantonio was a socialist and avid supporter of the working class, poor, immigrants, labor unions, and African-American civil rights.

Marcantonio represented the neighborhood of East Harlem in New York City (containing the smaller neighborhoods of Italian Harlem and Spanish Harlem), which was home to many ethnic Italians, Jews and Puerto Ricans. He spoke Spanish, Italian, and English.

Early life and education
Marcantonio was the son of an American-born father and Italian-born mother, both with origins in Picerno, in the Basilicata region of Southern Italy. He was born on December 10, 1902, in the impoverished Italian Harlem ghetto of East Harlem, New York City. He attended New York City public schools, becoming the only member of his class from East Harlem to graduate from De Witt Clinton High School in Hell's Kitchen, and eventually received his LL.B. from the New York University School of Law in 1925.

Career
In the 1920 United States presidential election, Marcantonio campaigned for Parley P. Christensen, the candidate of the Farmer-Labor Party. In 1924, he became campaign manager for the congressional campaign of Fiorello La Guardia, then a Progressive–Socialist. Together, LaGuardia and Marcantonio also campaigned for U.S. Senator Robert M. La Follette for President. Marcantonio also became secretary of the Tenants League, which fought high rents and evictions.

After passing the New York bar examination in 1925, Marcatonio began practicing law, first for Foster, La Guardia, and Cutler. He clerked at the law firm of Swinburne Hale, Walter Nelles, and Isaac Shorr, known for its representation of politically radical individuals and organizations. There, he worked with labor lawyer Joseph R. Brodsky, who "significantly contributed to his left orientation" toward Marxism.

From 1926 to 1932, Marcantonio ran La Guardia's campaigns every two years. From 1930 to 1931, he worked as an assistant United States attorney.

Political career

U.S. Congress

Marcantonio was first elected to the United States House of Representatives from New York in 1934 as a Republican.  He received a warm write-up in the New Masses in the November 1936 issue. He served in the House from 1935 until 1937 but was defeated in 1936 for re-election. Marcantonio's district was centered in his native East Harlem, New York City, which had many residents and immigrants of Italian and Puerto Rican origin. Fluent in Spanish as well as Italian, he was considered an ally of the Puerto Rican and Italian-American communities, and an advocate for the rights of the workers, immigrants, and the poor.

In 1939, Marcantonio criticized the 1936 prosecution and conviction of Puerto Rican Nationalist Party president Pedro Albizu Campos on charges of sedition and other crimes against the United States. In addition to defending the Puerto Rican and Italian communities and common workers, Marcantonio was a strong advocate of Harlem's African-American communities and fought vehemently for black civil rights decades before the civil rights movement of the 1950s–1960s. In either 1937 or 1938, Marcantonio became a member of the American Labor Party (ALP). He was elected to the House again from New York in 1938, and served this time for six terms, from 1939 to 1951, being reelected in the elections of 1940, 1942, 1944, 1946, and 1948. He was so popular in that district that he cross-filed in the cross-filing primaries between Democratic and Republican primaries, and won the nominations of both parties, and he also gained the endorsement of the ALP, an example of electoral fusion.

Aside from Marcantonio, the only other ALP congressman was Leo Isacson, who served in Congress from 1948 to 1949, after winning a special election; he was defeated in the next general election. On election day in 1946, a Republican election captain named Joseph Scottoriggio, who was supporting Marcantonio's opponent, was severely beaten and died days later. New York City mobster Mike Coppola is believed to have been responsible.

On November 25, 1947, the day after the House voted for indictment of the Hollywood Ten for contempt of Congress, Representative Walter Judd attacked Marcantonio by likening the ALP to the China Democratic League in China at that time. He said: "The history of the Democratic League is astonishingly like that of the American Labor Party to which the gentleman belongs. It was originally a coalition of labor groups, liberals and Communists. Then the genuine liberals discovered that it and they were being used as fronts or tools of the Communists, and, as the gentleman from New York is well aware, they broke off and established the Liberal Party."

In 1948, Marcantonio was an avid supporter of former Vice President Henry A. Wallace, who ran for President on the Progressive Party ticket. A campaign film by Carl Marzani shows Marcantonio's district and his efforts on its behalf. Marcantonio was reelected. In 1949, Marcantonio ran for Mayor of New York City on the ALP ticket but was defeated.

In 1950, Marcantonio was defeated by the Democrat James G. Donovan for his House seat, after a particularly vociferous campaign against him because of his refusal to vote for American participation in the Korean War. In that election, Donovan had the broad-based popular support of the Democratic, Republican, and Liberal parties. The passage of the Wilson Pakula Act in 1947 also played some part in Marcantonio's defeat. The law prevented candidates from running in the primaries of parties with which they were not affiliated. It was widely perceived as being directed against Marcantonio. As the sole representative of his party for most of his years in Congress, Marcantonio never held a committee chairmanship. After his defeat in 1950 and the withdrawal of the Communist Party support for the ALP, the party soon fell apart.

Political ideology
Marcantonio was inspired politically by his Roman Catholic faith. He had always identified himself as a Catholic. In 1939, while speaking at the National Conference of the ILD, he described himself as "a Roman Catholic who has not deserted the faith of his fathers."

Marcantonio, who was arguably one of the most left-wing members of Congress, said that party loyalty was less important than voting with his conscience. He was sympathetic to the Socialist and Communist parties, and to labor unions. He was investigated by the FBI in the 1940s and 1950s because of his extensive affiliation with members of the Communist Party and known Communist front groups.

Civil rights
In 2010, historian Thaddeus Russell described Marcantonio as "one of the greatest champions of black civil rights during the 1930s and 1940s." He sponsored bills to prohibit the poll tax, used by the Southern United States to disenfranchise poor voters, and to make lynching a federal crime.

Foreign policy
In 1940, Marcantonio helped form the American Peace Mobilization (APM), a group whose aim was to keep the U.S. from participating in World War II. Before the signing of the Molotov–Ribbentrop Pact in Moscow 23 August 1939, the APM's precursor organization, the Comintern-directed American League for Peace and Democracy, had been anti-Nazi. Marcantonio served as the APM's vice-chair. He appeared in a newsreel in 1940 denouncing "the imperialist war", a line taken by Joseph Stalin and his supporters in the Soviet Union (USSR) until Operation Barbarossa. The Pact lasted until the Germans broke it by invading the Soviet Union on 22 June 1941. In 1942, Marcantonio worked to expand the U.S. military commitment to a second front in Europe against the Nazi German expansion, which became Operation Torch. The USSR ordered Communist parties throughout the world to promote the idea to help it defeat Nazism. Marcantonio was also a vice president of the International Workers Order, a fraternal benefit society unofficially affiliated with the Communist Party.

In 1947, when the U.S. Congress passed legislation to provide financial aid to fight communism in Turkey and Greece, such as during the Greek Civil War, Marcantonio was the only congressman to not applaud the action, symbolizing his disagreement with the Truman Doctrine. In 1950, Marcantonio opposed American involvement in the Korean War. He argued that North Korea had been the victim of an unprovoked attack by South Korea. He cited articles by I. F. Stone, a radical journalist.

Freedom of expression
In 1941, Marcantonio represented Dale Zysman, a high school coach and board member of the New York City Teachers Union also known as Jack Hardy, a communist writer for International Publishers, in a New York Board of Education hearing. Marcantonio asked for a ten-day stay because the Board had failed to present "an itemized bill of particulars", which stay the Board denied. Zysman walked out.

Spanish in Puerto Rico's schools
In 1946, Marcantonio introduced legislation to restore Spanish as the language of instruction in Puerto Rico's schools asking President Harry S. Truman to sign the bill "in the name of the children of Puerto Rico who are being tortured by the prevailing system…to fight cultural chauvinism and to correct past errors." President Truman signed the bill. In 1948, schools were able to return to teaching in the Spanish language, but English was required in schools as a second language.

Later life and death
After his defeat in mayoral and congressional elections, Marcantonio continued to practice law. It was his law practice, maintained while in Congress, that had generated the money by which he substantially self-financed his political campaigns. At first, he practiced in Washington, D.C., but he soon returned to New York City. At the time of his death in 1954, Marcantonio was running for Congress as the candidate of a newly formed third party, the Good Neighbor Party. He died on August 9, 1954, from a heart attack after coming up the subway stairs on Broadway by City Hall Park in Lower Manhattan. As a devout Catholic, he was given conditional absolution and extreme unction, the last sacrament of the Church.

Legacy
Tony Kushner's play The Intelligent Homosexual's Guide to Capitalism and Socialism with a Key to the Scriptures has a main character who is a fictional cousin of Marcantonio, whose collection of speeches, I Vote My Conscience (1956), edited by Annette Rubenstein, influenced the next generation of young radicals. His defense of workers rights, his mastery of parliamentary procedure, his ability to relate to the workers in his district while also engaging in worldwide issues, made him a hero to a certain section of the left. Rubenstein's book was reprinted in a new edition in 2002.

Works
Pamphlets written by Marcantonio include:
 Labor's Martyrs': Haymarket 1887 Sacco and Vanzetti 1927 (1941)
 Should America Go to War? (1941)
 Marcantonio Answers F.D.R.! (1941)
 Security with FDR (1944)

References

Further reading
 Luconi, Stefano, "When East Harlem's Politics Was an Italian-American Matter: The Lanzetta–Marcantonio Congressional Races, 1934–1940," in Italian Signs, American Politics: Current Affairs, Historical Perspectives, Empirical Analyses, ed. Ottorino Cappelli, 113–66. (New York: John D. Calandra Italian American Institute, 2012. 236 pp.)
 
 Meyer, Gerald J. Vito Marcantonio: Radical Politician, 1902–1954 (1989)
 Simon, John J. "Rebel in the House," Monthly Review: An Independent Socialist Magazine (2006) 57#11 pp. 24–46.

External links

 John J. Simon, "Rebel in the House: The Life and Times of Vito Marcantonio", Monthly Review, 2006, Volume 57, Issue 11 (April)
 
 
 I Vote My Conscience: Speeches Writings Debates of Vito Marcantonio, edited by Annette T. Rubenstein, 1956/reprinted in new edition, 2002
 CENTRO: Remembering Vito Marcantonio. Archived.
 
 Vito Marcantonio Library
 

1902 births
1954 deaths
20th-century American lawyers
20th-century American politicians
Activists for African-American civil rights
American democratic socialists
American Labor Party politicians
American Labor Party members of the United States House of Representatives
American people of Italian descent
American Roman Catholics
American social democrats
Left-wing populism in the United States
Burials at Woodlawn Cemetery (Bronx, New York)
DeWitt Clinton High School alumni
Lawyers from New York City
New York University School of Law alumni
People from East Harlem
Politicians from New York City
Republican Party members of the United States House of Representatives from New York (state)
Catholics from New York (state)